Thomas P. Wood (June 13, 1927 – March 15, 2015) was a Canadian ice hockey player with the Lethbridge Maple Leafs. He won a gold medal at the 1951 World Ice Hockey Championships in Paris, France. The 1951 Lethbridge Maple Leafs team was inducted to the Alberta Sports Hall of Fame in 1974.

References

1927 births
2015 deaths
Ice hockey people from Alberta
Canadian ice hockey right wingers